Rocky Ripple is a town in Marion County, Indiana. The population was 606 at the 2010 census. It was founded in 1928; and the town was incorporated as an "included town" as part of Unigov in 1970. It is part of Indianapolis, but retains a separate functioning town government under IC 36-3-1-11. Although not far from the city center, Rocky Ripple is a somewhat isolated area, located between the Central Canal and the White River; only two traffic-supporting bridges over the canal provide access to the town.

Geography
Rocky Ripple is located at  (39.847091, -86.173137).

The vast majority of Rocky Ripple is located in a flood plain. A 2017 study found that the existing Rocky Ripple levee is in a seriously deteriorated condition. The analysis indicates that the levee currently has a 5% or greater annual chance of overtopping (20 year level of protection) and there is about a 92% chance that the levee will be over-topped at least once over the next 50 years.

Demographics

2010 census
As of the census of 2010, there were 606 people, 291 households, and 158 families living in the town. The racial makeup of the town was 89.1% White, 6.1% African American, 0.5% Native American, 0.8% Asian, 1.0% from other races, and 2.5% from two or more races. Hispanic or Latino of any race were 2.5% of the population.

There were 291 households, of which 23.7% had children under the age of 18 living with them, 37.1% were married couples living together, 11.0% had a female householder with no husband present, 6.2% had a male householder with no wife present, and 45.7% were non-families. 36.8% of all households were made up of individuals, and 9% had someone living alone who was 65 years of age or older. The average household size was 2.08 and the average family size was 2.75.

The median age in the town was 40.3 years. 18.2% of residents were under the age of 18; 6.7% were between the ages of 18 and 24; 30.2% were from 25 to 44; 31.2% were from 45 to 64; and 13.7% were 65 years of age or older. The gender makeup of the town was 49.3% male and 50.7% female.

2000 census
As of the census of 2000, there were 712 people, 322 households, and 183 families living in the town. The racial makeup of the town was 87.64% White, 9.27% African American, 0.14% Native American, 0.42% Asian, 0.28% from other races, and 2.25% from two or more races. Hispanic or Latino of any race were 1.69% of the population.

There were 322 households, out of which 24.8% had children under the age of 18 living with them, 39.4% were married couples living together, 13.4% had a female householder with no husband present, and 42.9% were non-families. 33.9% of all households were made up of individuals, and 8.7% had someone living alone who was 65 years of age or older. The average household size was 2.21 and the average family size was 2.87.

In the town, the population was spread out, with 20.9% under the age of 18, 5.8% from 18 to 24, 33.0% from 25 to 44, 25.3% from 45 to 64, and 15.0% who were 65 years of age or older. The median age was 40 years. For every 100 females, there were 89.9 males. For every 100 females age 18 and over, there were 87.7 males.

The median income for a household in the town was $144,464, and the median income for a family was $150,500. Males had a median income of $62,500 versus $60,000 for females. The per capita income for the town was $52,691. About 1.1% of families and 2.4% of the population were below the poverty line, including none of those under age 18 and 3.3% of those age 65 or over.

Notable events and venues 
The town has a park, Hohlt Park.

The town hosts the annual Rock Ripple Festival, a popular summer event that focuses on the arts and serves as the main fundraiser for the Rocky Ripple Community Association.

References

External links
 Town of Rocky Ripple, Indiana website
 Rocky Ripple weather (NWS)

Towns in Marion County, Indiana
Towns in Indiana
Indianapolis metropolitan area